The Silent Minute was an historic movement begun in the United Kingdom by Major Wellesley Tudor Pole O.B.E. in 1940. It continues today as a London-based charity following its revival by Dorothy Forster.  During the Second World War people would unite in meditation, prayer or focus (each according to their own belief) and consciously will for peace to prevail. This dedicated minute received the direct support of King George VI, Sir Winston Churchill and his Parliamentary Cabinet. It was also recognized by U.S. President Franklin D. Roosevelt and observed on land and at sea on the battlefields, in air raid shelters and in hospitals. With Churchill’s support, the BBC, on Sunday, November 10, 1940, began to play the bells of Big Ben on the radio as a signal for the Silent Minute to begin.

History

The idea was developed in Britain in the Second World War, initially from an idea by Major Wellesley Tudor Pole. People were asked to devote one minute of prayer for peace at nine o’clock each evening.  He said:
“There is no power on earth that can withstand the united cooperation on spiritual levels of men and women of goodwill everywhere. It is for this reason that the continued and widespread observance of the Silent Minute is of such vital importance in the interest of human welfare.” 

The Silent Minute began in 1940 during The Blitz on the UK when Major Wellesley Tudor-Pole perceived
an inner request from a high spiritual source that there be a Silent Minute of Prayer for Freedom, at 9pm each evening during the striking of Big Ben. If enough people joined in this gesture of dedicated intent, the tide would turn and the invasion of England would be diverted. 
Tudor-Pole went to the King and Prime Minister with his request and won both their support. 

An anecdote emphasizes the profound power of the group meditation of the Silent Minute. In 1945 a British intelligence officer was interrogating a high Nazi official. He asked him why he thought Germany lost the war. His reply was, “During the war, you had a secret weapon for which we could find no counter measure, which we did not understand, but it was very powerful. It was associated with the striking of the Big Ben each evening. I believe you called it the ‘Silent Minute.’

Silent Minute in the 21st century

The Silent Minute was revived by Dorothy Forster and gained a new following of people after the 9/11 terrorist attack on the World Trade Center and the commencement of the wars in Iraq and Afghanistan. It continues as a small charitable organisation based in London, but with a worldwide list of participants. Some people had continued the habit of the 9 p.m. prayer ever since the Second World War, but diverting their focus to the different areas of the World wherever there were conflicts currently ongoing.  Apart from these few people, the practice had been largely forgotten by the British public for almost half a century until it was revived.

The trustees maintain that there is always war going on somewhere in the World and that uniting in a collective will for peace may have some beneficial effect for humankind, whether or not there is any direct effect upon the conflict. At the heart of the effort there is a community united from people of all ages, races and backgrounds, and a focus on our collective humanity and the benefits of peace in society.

The Silent Minute does not have any political affiliations and receives no funding, but runs entirely on donations from the general public.

See also
Moment of silence

Two-minute silence

References

External links
 Silent Minute website
 Major Wellesley Tudor-Pole biography 
 Remembrance History 

Commemoration
Silence